Pseudotachea is a genus of medium-sized air-breathing land snails, terrestrial pulmonate gastropod mollusks in the subfamily Helicinae of the family Helicidae.

Like many Helicidae, this genus of snails create and use love darts.

Species
 Pseudotachea liturata (L. Pfeiffer, 1851)
 Pseudotachea splendida (Draparnaud, 1801)
Species inquirendum
 † Pseudotachea torresi (Roman, 1907) 
Species brought into synonymy
 Pseudotachea cotteri (Roman, 1907) †: synonym of Megalotachea cotteri (Roman, 1907) †
 Pseudotachea ogerieni (Delafond & Depéret, 1893) †: synonym of Frechenia ogerieni (Delafond & Depéret, 1893) †
 Pseudotachea tersannensis (Locard, 1878) †: synonym of Megalotachea delphinensis (Fontannes, 1876) † (junior synonym)

References

 Pfeffer, G. (1930). Zur Kenntnis tertiärer Landschnecken. Geologisch-Paläontologische Abhandlungen, neue Folge. 17(3): 153-380, pl. 15-17.
 Bank, R. A. (2017). Classification of the Recent terrestrial Gastropoda of the World. Last update: July 16th, 2017

External links
 Boettger, C.R. (1909). Ein Beitrag zur Erforschung der europäischen Heliciden. Nachrichtsblatt der Deutschen Malakozoologischen Gesellschaft. 41(1): 1-19

Helicidae
Gastropod genera